Pier Simone Fanelli (29 December 1641 -  1703) was an Italian painter active in the Region of the Marche, active in a Baroque style.

Biography
He was born in Ancona and died in Cingoli. His training is unclear. By 1665-1666 he was painting in the church of the Filippini in Recanati. By 1680, he was employed by the Cappuccini in Macerata. In Macerata he worked with Giovanni Domenico Ferracuti, a landscape painter. He also worked with Paolo Marini, to decorate the church of San Filippo Neri in Cingoli.

References

1641 births
1703 deaths
17th-century Italian painters
Italian male painters
18th-century Italian painters
Italian Baroque painters
18th-century Italian male artists